The 1895 Tufts Jumbos football team was an American football team that represented Tufts College—now known as Tufts University—as an independent during the 1895 college football season. The team compiled an 8–5 record and outscored opponents by a total of 132 to 101. Marshall Newell, a four-time consensus All-American at Harvard, was the team's head coach.

Schedule

References

Tufts
Tufts Jumbos football seasons
Tufts Jumbos football